"The Highlights of 100" is an hour-long, two-part episode of the NBC sitcom Seinfeld. This is the 14th and 15th episodes for the sixth season, and the 100th and 101st overall episode. It aired on February 2, 1995. It is a clip show with no new content apart from a 50 second long intro by Jerry Seinfeld. In syndication, it airs as two separate episodes of 30 minutes each, with a second intro at the beginning of the second episode. This is the first episode in the series not to open with a stand-up routine. 

"The Highlights of 100" was the first Seinfeld episode available on home video, released on VHS in 1995.

Clips

Part 1
403 "The Pitch" – Jerry and George discussing the merits of a "show about nothing"
311 "The Red Dot" – Kramer noticing the dot on Elaine's sweater
306 "The Parking Garage" – The cast trying to remember where their car is parked
411 "The Contest" – Kramer declaring "I'm out."
314 "The Pez Dispenser" – Elaine laughing at the Pez dispenser during the piano recital
206 "The Chinese Restaurant" – Jerry, Elaine, and George placing their reservation
422 "The Smelly Car" – Jerry and Elaine discovering the lingering odor in Jerry's car
311 "The Red Dot" – Mr. Lippman firing George from Pendant Publishing
209 "The Stranded" – Elaine: "Maybe the dingo ate your baby."
518 "The Fire" – Kramer telling the tale of his mission to rescue Toby's severed toe
405 "The Wallet" – Morty Seinfeld yelling about his stolen wallet
517 "The Wife" – Uncle Leo meeting Jerry at the dry cleaners
519/520 "The Raincoats" – Morty and Helen confronting Jerry about making out during Schindler's List
504 "The Sniffing Accountant" – Frank Costanza teaching George about bra sizes
411 "The Contest" – George visiting Estelle in the hospital
418 "The Old Man" – Newman explaining why the job of a postal worker is so stressful
102 "Male Unbonding" – Elaine and Jerry deciding where to go out
305 "The Pen" – Jerry reluctantly taking Jack Klompus' astronaut pen
503 "The Puffy Shirt" – Kramer revealing the puffy shirt to Jerry
310 "The Alternate Side" – Jerry explaining the difference between taking and holding a reservation
403 "The Pitch" – Jerry and George pitching the "Jerry" pilot to NBC

"Relationships"
318 "The Limo"
522 "The Hamptons"
302 "The Truth"
516 "The Stand-In"
422 "The Smelly Car"
609 "The Secretary"
611 "The Label Maker"
509 "The Masseuse"
317 "The Fix-Up" – Jerry setting George up with Cynthia/Elaine setting Cynthia up with George
303 "The Dog"/203 "The Busboy" – Kramer breaking up with his girlfriend/Elaine hurriedly packing for her boyfriend (these two segments are interwoven)
506 "The Lip Reader" – George claiming creation of "It's not you, it's me"
315/316 "The Boyfriend" – Elaine on a date with Keith Hernandez
201 "The Ex-Girlfriend" – Marlene breaking up with Jerry
421 "The Junior Mint" – Jerry trying to guess "Mulva's" name
408 "The Cheever Letters" – Sandra leaving Jerry's apartment after the panty remark
419 "The Implant" – Sidra leaving Jerry's apartment ("By the way, they're real...and they're spectacular.")
213 "The Deal" – Jerry and Elaine laying down "the rules"/Jerry giving George the details

"Ambition"
315/316 "The Boyfriend" – George telling Jerry to answer the phone as "Vandelay Industries"
102 "Male Unbonding" – Kramer's idea for a pizza place where you make your own pie
513 "The Marine Biologist" – Elaine sharing the fake anecdote about Tolstoy's War and Peace
103 "The Stake Out" – George: "I'm an architect."
601 "The Chaperone" – Elaine's job interview at Doubleday Publishing
513 "The Marine Biologist" – George: "You know that I always wanted to pretend I was an architect!"
612 "The Race" – George faking his life story about architecture
521 "The Opposite" – Kramer on Live with Regis and Kathie Lee promoting his coffee table book
315/316 "The Boyfriend" – Kramer unwittingly ruining George's "Vandelay Industries" scam

Part 2

"Off The Subject"
105 "The Stock Tip" – Jerry and George discussing Superman's sense of humor
504 "The Sniffing Accountant" – Kramer and Newman discussing how days of the week feel
419 "The Implant" – George accused of double-dipping a chip
406 "The Watch" – Kramer's affinity for decaf cappuccinos
315/316 "The Boyfriend" – Jerry and George discussing their favorite explorers
410 "The Virgin" – Elaine's diaphragm story
315/316 "The Boyfriend" – Kramer and Newman's JFK-esque Keith Hernandez story
404 "The Ticket" – George praising the value of characters in entertainment
418 "The Old Man" – Sid Fields
307 "The Cafe" – Babu Bhatt
501 "The Mango" – Joe the fruit stand manager
605 "The Couch" – Poppie
409 "The Opera" – Crazy Joe Davola
608 "The Soup" – Kenny Bania
516 "The Stand-In" – Mickey
304 "The Library" – Detective Bookman
205 "The Jacket" – Alton Benes
606 "The Gymnast" – Mr. Pitt

"Self-Images"
208 "The Apartment" – Jerry and George arguing over which one of them is the bigger idiot
420 "The Handicap Spot" – Kramer asking Jerry and George if he is a "hipster doofus"
422 "The Smelly Car" – Elaine wondering if she's not as attractive as she thinks
416 "The Outing" – Jerry and George insisting that they aren't gay ("Not that there's anything wrong with that")
501 "The Mango" – Elaine revealing she faked her orgasms with Jerry
414 "The Visa" – George: "I'm disturbed, I'm depressed, I'm inadequate – I got it all!"
521 "The Opposite" – Elaine worries that she has become George
521 "The Opposite" – George enacting his new policy of doing the opposite of what his instincts tell him

"Catch Phrases"
310 "The Alternate Side" – "These pretzels are makin' me thirsty!"
420 "The Handicap Spot" – "Boy, I'm really startin' to dislike the Drake!"
319 "The Good Samaritan" – "You are so good-lookin'."
503 "The Puffy Shirt" – "She's one of those low talkers."
603 "The Pledge Drive" – "You know, because he's a high talker."
519/520 "The Raincoats" – "He's nice, bit of a close talker."
512 "The Stall" – "I don't have a square to spare."
314 "The Pez Dispenser" – "I need hand! I have no hand!"
519/520 "The Raincoats" – "Newman!"
507 "The Barber" – "Newman!"
602 "The Big Salad" – "Newman!"
611 "The Label Maker" – "Hello, Newman."
411 "The Contest" – "Master of my domain"/"King of the county"/"Lord of the manor"/"Queen of the castle"
522 "The Hamptons" – "You mean shrinkage?"
417 "The Shoes" – Russel Dalrymple with an upset stomach discussing the "Jerry" script with Jerry and George
313 "The Subway" – Kramer stumbling to get a seat on the subway
504 "The Sniffing Accountant" – Kramer smoking and drinking at the same time
409 "The Opera" – Kramer singing opera
515 "The Pie" – Olive scratching Kramer's itch
405 "The Wallet" – Kramer screaming with his hair on fire
502 "The Glasses" – Kramer diving after Jerry's plummeting air conditioner
513 "The Marine Biologist" – Kramer playing golf at the beach
411 "The Contest" – The instigation of the contest

"Sensitivity"
518 "The Fire" – George fleeing from the fire
407 "The Bubble Boy" – Jerry's apathetic reaction to the plight of the bubble boy
309 "The Nose Job" – Kramer: "You're as pretty as any of them; you just need a nose job."
310 "The Alternate Side" – Elaine feeding her 60-year-old stroke-stricken boyfriend
202 "The Pony Remark" – Jerry's pony remark
407 "The Bubble Boy" – George asking Susan for recompense for the tolls as the cabin burns down
521 "The Opposite" – Jake Jarmel learning that Elaine stopped off for Jujyfruits
202 "The Pony Remark" – Jerry: "Who figures an immigrant's gonna have a pony?"
421 "The Junior Mint" – Kramer dropping the Junior Mint into the operating area
421 "The Junior Mint" – "It's a Junior Mint!"
312 "The Suicide" – "Drake's Coffee Cake?"
410 "The Virgin" – "Snapple?" "No thanks."
314 "The Pez Dispenser" – "Pez?"
521 "The Opposite" – "Box of Jujyfruits?"
514 "The Dinner Party" – "Clark Bar."
407 "The Bubble Boy" – "I love Yoo Hoo."
602 "The Big Salad" – "Ooh, Chunkies."
514 "The Dinner Party" – "Chocolate babka."
514 "The Dinner Party" – "It's Gore-Tex."
517 "The Wife" – "Cashmere?" "No, Gore-Tex."
421 "The Junior Mint" – "Who's gonna turn down a Junior Mint? It's chocolate, it's peppermint – it's delicious!"
513 "The Marine Biologist" – George recounts how he rescued the beached whale
403 "The Pitch" – Jerry finally subscribes to the idea of a "show about nothing"
306 "The Parking Garage" – Kramer's car refusing to start
206 "The Chinese Restaurant" – "Seinfeld, four!"

References

External links
 

Seinfeld (season 6) episodes
1995 American television episodes
Clip shows
Seinfeld episodes in multiple parts